Géza Tóth (25 January 1932 – 4 October 2011) was a Hungarian weightlifter. He won a silver medal in the Men's Light-Heavyweight event at the 1964 Summer Olympics.

References

External links
 

1932 births
2011 deaths
Hungarian male weightlifters
Olympic weightlifters of Hungary
Weightlifters at the 1960 Summer Olympics
Weightlifters at the 1964 Summer Olympics
Weightlifters at the 1968 Summer Olympics
Olympic silver medalists for Hungary
Olympic medalists in weightlifting
Sportspeople from Vas County
Medalists at the 1964 Summer Olympics
20th-century Hungarian people
21st-century Hungarian people